The Gare de Périgueux is the railway station in the town of Périgueux, in the Dordogne department in France. The station opened in 1857 and is located on the Limoges-Bénédictins - Périgueux and Coutras - Tulle railway lines. The station is served by Intercités (Long distance) and TER (regional) services operated by SNCF, the French national railway.

Train services

The station is served by regional trains to Bordeaux, Limoges, Brive-la-Gaillarde and Agen.

Gallery

References

Railway stations in Dordogne
Railway stations in France opened in 1857